Notobalanus vestitus is a species of acorn barnacle in the family Balanidae.

References

External links

 

Barnacles